Alfadanga is an upazila of Faridpur District in the Division of Dhaka, Bangladesh.

Geography
It has 16,579 households and total area 136 km2.

Demographics
As of the 1991 Bangladesh census, Alfadanga has a population of 90,873. Males constitute 49.83% of the population, and females 50.17%. This Upazila's eighteen up population is 43,335. Alfadanga has an average literacy rate of 32.5% (7+ years), and the national average of 32.4% literate.

Administration
Alfadanga Upazila is divided into 6 union parishads: Alfadanga, Bana, Buraich, Gopalpur, Pachuria, and Tagarband. The union parishads are subdivided into 92 mauzas and 122 villages.

See also
Upazilas of Bangladesh
Districts of Bangladesh
Divisions of Bangladesh

References

Upazilas of Faridpur District